Andrew Speight Quartet is a self-titled studio album by an Australian jazz group, led by Andrew Speight, which was released in October 1998. The line-up was Speight on alto saxophone, Andrew Dickeson on drums, John Harkins on piano and David Rosin on bass guitar. At the ARIA Music Awards of 1999 it won Best Jazz Album.

Track listing

Andrew Speight Quartet ABC Music/EMI 
 "A Night in Tunisia"
 "Out of the Past"
 "Will You Still Be Mine?"	
 "Easy Living"	
 "Ow"	
 "Au Privave"	
 "Distant Dreams"	
 "Quintessence"
 "Dexterity"	
 "Dear John"
 "Back to the Old School"

Personnel 

 Andrew Speight – alto saxophone
 Andrew Dickeson – drums
 John Harkins – piano
 David Rosin – bass guitar

References

1998 albums
ARIA Award-winning albums
Jazz albums by Australian artists